Marc Kern (born April 28, 1989) is a Swiss ice hockey goaltender. He is currently playing with the SC Langenthal of the National League B.

References

External links

1989 births
Living people
SC Bern players
SC Langenthal players
SCL Tigers players
Swiss ice hockey goaltenders